Queen's Bridge is a toll-free bridge in the city of Perth, Scotland. It spans the River Tay, connecting Perth, on the western side of the river, to Bridgend, on its eastern side. It carries both automotive and pedestrian traffic of South Street, one of Perth's three main streets from mediaeval times.

Queen's Bridge replaced Victoria Bridge, which stood between 1902 and 1958–1959, and was opened by Queen Elizabeth II on 10 October 1960. The pier on the bridge's eastern side is a remnant of the previous structure.

The construction of Victoria Bridge required the demolition of Rodney Lodge, which stood in today’s Rodney Gardens.

Construction

The bridge was erected at a cost of £150,000, the work of Whatlings Ltd and consulting engineers F. A. MacDonald & Partners.

References

Bridges in Perth, Scotland
Bridges across the River Tay
Bridges completed in 1960
1960 establishments in Scotland